Year 1443 (MCDXLIII) was a common year starting on Tuesday (link will display the full calendar) of the Julian calendar.

Events 
<onlyinclude>

January–December 
 July 22 – Battle of St. Jakob an der Sihl (Old Zürich War): The forces of the city of Zürich are defeated, but the Swiss Confederacy have insufficient strength to besiege and take the city.
 November 8 – Battle of Niš: John Hunyadi and the army of the Crusade of Varna defeat three armies of the Ottoman Empire, and capture the city of Niš in modern-day Serbia; Skanderbeg deserts the Ottoman camp and goes to Albania.
 November 28 – Skanderbeg and his forces, rebelling against the Ottoman Empire, liberate Krujë, in Middle Albania, and raise the Albanian flag.

Date unknown 
 In Moldavia, the conflict between brothers and co-rulers Iliaș and Stephen II reignites, and Stephen captures Iliaș and blinds him, thus remaining sole ruler of the country.
 Portuguese explorer Nuno Tristão penetrates the Arguin Gulf, off the west coast of Africa.
 King Sejong the Great establishes Hangul, as the native alphabet of the Korean language.
 Vlad II Dracul begins his second term as ruler of Wallachia, succeeding Basarab II.
 The Buddhist Zhihua Temple (智化寺) is built in Beijing, at the order of Wang Zhen, chief eunuch at the court of the Zhengtong Emperor of Ming Dynasty China.
 A powerful earthquake destroys the Timișoara Fortress in the Kingdom of Hungary

Births 
 January 27 – Albert III, Duke of Saxony (d. 1500)
 February 2 – Elisabeth of Bavaria, Electress of Saxony (d. 1484)
 February 12 – Giovanni II Bentivoglio, Italian noble (d. 1508)
 February 23 – Matthias Corvinus, of Hungary (d. 1490)
 May 17 – Edmund, Earl of Rutland, brother of Kings Edward IV of England and Richard III of England (d. 1460)
 May 29 – Victor, Duke of Münsterberg, Reichsgraf, Duke of Münsterberg and Opava, Count of Glatz (d. 1500)
 May 31 or 1441 – Margaret Beaufort, Countess of Richmond and Derby, English noble, mother of King Henry VII, grandmother of King Henry VIII of England (d. 1509)
 June 29 – Anthony Browne, English knight (d. 1506)
 September 9 – Muhammad Jaunpuri (d. 1505)
 November 10 – Adolf III of Nassau-Wiesbaden-Idstein, Germany noble (d. 1511)
 December 1 – Magdalena of France, French princess and regent of Navarre (d. 1495)
 December 5 – Pope Julius II (d. 1513)
 probable
 Piero del Pollaiuolo, Italian painter (d. 1496)
 Ygo Gales Galama, Frisian warlord and freedom fighting rebel (d. 1492)

Deaths 
 January 16 – Erasmo of Narni, Italian mercenary (b. 1370)
 January 28 – Robert le Maçon, Chancellor of France
 February – Guidantonio da Montefeltro, count of Urbino (b. 1377)
 March 24 – James Douglas, 7th Earl of Douglas (b. 1371)
 April 12 – Henry Chichele, Archbishop of Canterbury
 May – John II, Count of Nassau-Siegen
 May 9 – Niccolò Albergati, Italian cardinal and diplomat (b. 1373)
 June 5 – Ferdinand the Holy Prince of Portugal (b. 1402)
 August 16 – Ashikaga Yoshikatsu, Japanese shōgun (b. 1434)
 September 18 – Lewis of Luxembourg, Archbishop of Rouen 
 date unknown – Infante Diogo, Constable of Portugal
 Jelena Balšić, Serbian duchess (b. 1366)
 probable – Zeami Motokiyo, Japanese actor and playwright (b. 1363)

References